C'est C Bon is the fifth album by Carlene Carter. It was released in 1983 via Epic Records. The album was also her last pop album before she switched to mainstream country music for I Fell in Love (1990). It was reissued on the Razor & Tie label in 1995.

The album was produced by Roger Bechirian.

Track listing
All tracks composed by Carlene Carter and James Eller; except where indicated

 "Meant It for a Minute"
 "Heart to Heart" (Simon Climie)
 "Third Time Charm" (Carter, Pete Marsh, Andy Howell, Roger Bechirian)
 "Heart's in Traction"
 "I'm the Kinda Sugar Daddy Likes"
 "Breathless" (Otis Blackwell)
 "Love Like a Glove"
 "Cool Reaction" (Pete Marsh, Andy Howell)
 "Don't Give My Heart a Break" (Carter, Nick Lowe, Paul Carrack)
 "That Boy" (Carter)
 "One Way Ticket" (Carter)
 "Patient Love" (Carter)

Personnel
 Carlene Carter - keyboards, vocals
 Roger Bechirian - keyboards, percussion, vocals
 Pete Marsh - guitar, keyboards, vocals
 James Eller - bass, guitar, keyboards
 Andy Howell - bass, guitar, keyboards
 Terry Williams - drums
 Paul Cobbold - cello bass, engineer

The Bat Horns
 Annie Whitehead - trombone
 Gary Barnacle - saxophone
 Luke Turney - trumpet
 Tony Visconti - horn arrangement on "One Way Ticket"

References

1983 albums
Carlene Carter albums
Albums produced by Roger Bechirian
Epic Records albums